Three ships of the Royal Navy have borne the name HMS Melville:

 HMS Melville was an 18-gun brig-sloop, previously the French ship Naiade (Nayade).  captured her in 1805; Melville was sold in 1808.
 , also known as HMS Lord Melville, was a 14-gun brig launched in 1813, renamed HMS Star in 1814 and sold in 1837.
  was a 74-gun third rate launched in 1817, used as a hospital ship from 1857, and sold in 1873.

See also
 
 

Royal Navy ship names